Friedrich August Schack (27 March 1892 – 24 July 1968) was a German general during World War II. He is best known for his pyrrhic defense of Caen after the allied invasion, September 1944, and for his brief leadership of the LXXXI Army Corps defending Aachen and the Siegfried Line.

Career
Schack enlisted in the army, 6 August 1914 and fought in World War I. After the war he was retained in the Reichsheer where he served in junior officer roles. In 1934, Schack was appointed tactics teacher in the war college in Dresden. In 1937, he reached the rank of lieutenant colonel.

Schack took part in the invasion of Poland and Operation Barbarossa, the invasion of the Soviet Union. On 1 October 1942 he became commander of the war College in Potsdam. On 7 May 1943 he became commander of the 216th Infantry-Division.  On 1 July 1943 Schack was promoted to major general and commander of the 216th Infantry division. Schack led his division in bloody combat in Orel, July 1943, during the Battle of Kursk, and suffered heavy losses.

Some of the surviving soldiers were sent to Belgium, where they became the 272nd Infantry-Division. On 15 December 1943 Schack was appointed commander of the division. As such he was promoted, 1 January 1944, to lieutenant general. For leading his division during the defense of Caen after D Day, Schack was awarded, 21 September 1944, the Knight's Cross of the Iron Cross with Oak Leaves. However, Schack had sustained heavy losses during the battle and was suffering severe combat fatigue.

On 4 September 1944 Schack became leader of the LXXXI Army corps, five badly mauled divisions, charged with defending Aachen and the Siegfried Line. Schack's superiors became dissatisfied with his performance and replaced him with General Friedrich Köchling. Beginning 15 November 1944 Schack led the LXXXV army corps in southern France and the Ardennes for one month.

On 26 March 1945 Schack was assigned to lead the XXXII Army Corps, on the Oder near Stettin. On 20 April 1945 Schack was promoted to General of Infantry and commanding general of the XXXII Army corps. At war's end the Allies imprisoned him. They released him 24 March 1948.

Awards and decorations
 Iron Cross (1914) 2nd Class (22 March 1916) & 1st Class (29 March 1918)
 Clasp to the Iron Cross (1939) 2nd Class (10 October 1939) & 1st Class (25 June 1940)
 Knight's Cross of the Iron Cross with Oak Leaves
 Knight's Cross on 24 July 1941 as Oberst and commander of Infanterie-Regiment 392
 Oak Leaves on 21 September 1944 as Generalleutnant and commander of 272. Infanterie-Division

Bibliography

Citations

Bibliography

 
 
 

1892 births
1968 deaths
People from the Province of Silesia
Generals of Infantry (Wehrmacht)
German Army personnel of World War I
Prussian Army personnel
Recipients of the clasp to the Iron Cross, 1st class
Recipients of the Knight's Cross of the Iron Cross with Oak Leaves
Reichswehr personnel
People from Karkonosze County
Recipients of the Order of Military Merit (Bulgaria)
German Army generals of World War II